Georgetown–Ridge Farm Community Unit District 4, also known as GRF Unit #4, is a school district in Vermilion County, Illinois. It serves the communities of Georgetown and Ridge Farm.

Jean Neal is the superintendent.

Schools
Georgetown–Ridge Farm High School
Mary Miller Junior High School
Pine Crest Elementary School

References

External links

Education in Vermilion County, Illinois
School districts in Illinois